Darvishi (also Romanized as Darvīshī; also known as Darinshi, Darvīahi, and Darvīshān) is a village in Shonbeh Rural District, Shonbeh and Tasuj District, Dashti County, Bushehr Province, Iran. At the 2006 census, its population was 412, in 88 families.

References 

Populated places in Dashti County